50th Regiment or 50th Infantry Regiment may refer to:

Infantry regiments
 50th (Queen's Own) Regiment of Foot, a unit of the British Army, 1755–1881
 Shirley's Regiment (50th Regiment of Foot, American Provincials), a unit of the British Army 
 50th (Northumbrian) Infantry Division, a unit of the British Army
 50th Infantry Regiment (United States), a unit of the United States Army
 50th Infantry Regiment (Greece), a unit of the Greek Army
 The Canadian Scottish Regiment (Princess Mary's), a unit of the Canadian Army

American Civil War regiments

Union (Northern) regiments
 50th Illinois Volunteer Infantry Regiment
 50th Indiana Infantry Regiment
 50th Ohio Infantry
 50th Pennsylvania Infantry
 50th Wisconsin Volunteer Infantry Regiment
 50th United States Colored Infantry Regiment

Confederate (Southern) regiments
 50th Georgia Volunteer Infantry
 50th North Carolina Infantry
 50th Virginia Infantry

Other regiments
 50th Anti-Aircraft Missile Regiment (Romania), a unit of the Romanian Army
 50th Royal Tank Regiment, a unit of the British Army
 50th Armoured Regiment (India), a unit of the Indian Army
 50th Indian Tank Brigade, a unit of the Indian Army
 50th Field Artillery Regiment (The Prince of Wales Rangers), RCA, a unit of the Canadian Army

See also
 50th Division (disambiguation)
 50th Brigade (disambiguation)
 50th Squadron (disambiguation)